Alan Reid (born 1976) is a contemporary American artist who lives in New York City.

His gauzy, colored-pencil representational images of heiresses, bored fashionistas and aquiline beauties have been called provocatively light, with coloring as delicate as his women are elegant.

The work invites reasoning, provocation and negotiation of absurdist scenarios involving majestic women in insipid situations.

References

External links 
 Official website
Artworks (gallery website)
Artworks (gallery website)

1976 births
Living people
American contemporary artists